Heddal is a village and parish in Notodden municipality in Telemark County, Norway.

History 
The parish of Hitterdal was established as a municipality January 1, 1838 (see formannskapsdistrikt). Notodden was separated from Heddal both as a city and a municipality of its own, in 1913. Heddal was subsequently merged with Notodden January 1, 1964. The Heddal clerical district consists of two parishes: Hitterdal and Lisleherad.

Etymology 
The Old Norse form of the name was Heitrardalr. The first element is the genitive case of a former name of the River Heitr, now known as Heddøla, a tributary of the Skien River. The last element is dalr meaning dale or valley. The original meaning of the river name is unknown. Until 1918 the name was written Hitterdal or Hiterdal. From 1918 on, the name has been Heddal.

Geography 
Nearby rivers include the River Hjartdøla.

Notable people from Heddal 
 Egil Bergsland (1924–2007), Norwegian politician for the Labour Party
 Thorolf Bugge (1879–1935), Norwegian trade unionist and politician
 Olea Crøger (1801–1855), Folklore collector, who published old folk tunes
 Sigmund Groven (born 1946), Norwegian classical harmonica player
 Hans Herbjørnsrud (1938-), Author of short stories.

See also 
 Asteroid 15050 Heddal
 Heddal Stave Church (built after 1150)
 Heddal Open Air Museum

External links 
 Church at Hitterdal, Norway

Villages in Vestfold og Telemark
Former municipalities of Norway
Notodden